Saint Helena competed at the 2018 Commonwealth Games in the Gold Coast, Australia from April 4 to April 15, 2018.

The Saint Helena team consisted of nine athletes (all male) that competed in four sports.

Swimmer Ben Dillon was the island's flag bearer during the opening ceremony.

Competitors
The following is the list of number of competitors participating at the Games per sport/discipline.

Athletics

Men
Track & road events

Badminton

Saint Helena participated with one athlete (one man).

Singles

Shooting

Saint Helena participated with two athletes (two men).

Men

Swimming

Saint Helena participated with five male swimmers.

Men

References

Nations at the 2018 Commonwealth Games
Saint Helena at the Commonwealth Games
2018 in Saint Helena